Benedict John "Benny" Vigona (born 9 October 1958) is a former Australian rules footballer best known for playing for  in the West Australian Football League (WAFL).

Biography
Vigona is from a large extended family who are heavily involved in Northern Territory football. His father, Anastasius, played for St Mary's in Darwin. His brother Tony spent time with South Melbourne in the Victorian Football League (VFL) without playing a league match before playing with St Mary's.

Playing career
Vigona made his league debut for South Fremantle in 1977. He was a member of the Bulldogs' 1980 premiership-winning team. He played his last match for South Fremantle in 1986 having played 165 matches.

During southern summers, Vigona returned to Darwin to play for St Mary's in the Northern Territory Football League (NTFL). He played in two premierships for the Saints during the 1977/78 and 1983/84 seasons. He was the Chaney Medallist for best player in the 1977/78 NTFL Grand Final.

He was the first player from the Northern Territory to become a life member of South Fremantle. In 1994 he was named in the NTFL Team of Two Decades for the period from 1974 to 1994. In 2009 was included in the Bulldogs' Indigenous Team of the Century.

References

1958 births
Sportspeople from Darwin, Northern Territory
South Fremantle Football Club players
St Mary's Football Club (NTFL) players
Indigenous Australian players of Australian rules football
Australian rules footballers from the Northern Territory
Living people
Place of birth missing (living people)
Rioli family